Jir Bagh (also Romanized as Jīr Bāgh; also known as Jīreh Bāgh) is a village in Shirju Posht Rural District, Rudboneh District, Lahijan County, Gilan Province, Iran. At the 2006 census, its population was 363, in 101 families.

References 

Populated places in Lahijan County